Llapusha (indefinite Albanian: Llapushë;) is a geographic and ethnographic region in Kosovo, including the eastern portion of the larger Metohija region which includes the western part of Kosovo. It is located between Podgor, Podrimlje, Drenica and Lapušnik. It stretches mainly over the basin area of two rivers, lower Klina and Miruša, and includes ca. 40 settlements. Orahovac is the centre of Llapusha. The area is predominantly inhabited by Albanians.

Geography
Llapusha is one of the parts of Metohija. It is located between Podgor, Podrimlje, Drenica and Lapušnik. It is a hilly region that includes the landscape on the left riverbank of Beli Drim, from Podgor to the watershed of Miruša and Klina; spreading from the western rim of southern Drenica, on the left side of the Beli Drim. It stretches mainly over the basin area of two rivers, lower Klina and Miruša, and includes ca. 40 settlements. Orahovac is the centre of Llapusha. It includes the municipalities of Orahovac, Klina, Mališevo and northern Suva Reka.

History
Part of Llapusha was included in the 1455 defter of the Branković lands.

Demographics
Llapusha is predominantly inhabited by Muslim Albanians. Velika Hoča is a Serb enclave located in Orahovac municipality. There is a small Romani community.

Anthropology
According to ethnographical studies published in 1912, Llapusha had 44 villages with 231 Serb, 457 Albanian Muslim, 108 Catholic and 14 Muhajir families.

Svetozar Raičević studied Metohijski Podgor and Llapusha, publishing preliminary results in 1935. He described that: Podgor takes up the northern part of Metohija and extends from Peć to the village of Rudnik on the road between Peć and Kosovska Mitrovica. Llapusha is south of this region, on the left side of the Drim, and reaches to the Miruša river. The old Serb population was almost entirely displaced, and one part was Albanianized. The Serb population in these regions, at that time, were mostly settled from the Dinaric areas. He noted that the ethnic movements in these areas were not yet completed. Serbs were more numerous than the Albanians. There were clean Serb villages and those where Serbs and Albanians lived together, only little villages with clean Albanian population. Catholic Albanians were only present in the municipality of Zlokućane and in Đurakovac; the rest of the Albanians are all Muslims. Apart from Serbs and Albanians there were Gypsies, of two types, the Mađupi and Gabelji, Muslims. A special group of people were the Čitaci, in the villages of Čitak and Broćna, who "don't know their ancestry, their mother tongue is Albanian, and they also know a little Serbian".

References

Sources

Geographical regions of Kosovo
Kosovo Ethnographic Regions
Albanian ethnographic regions